Prince Charming is a German reality dating show that premiered on October 30, 2019, streaming on premium sector of RTL+ and began airing on April 20, 2020, on television on VOX. The concept of the show is modeled after Der Bachelor, but with gay men and instead of having a rose ceremony, it features a black tie ceremony.

The second season began streaming on October 12, 2020, on RTL+ and began airing on television on October 19, 2020, on VOX. On November 23, 2020, the show was extended for a third season, which began streaming on August 17, 2021, on RTL+ and on television on February 7, 2022, on VOX. It was renewed for a fourth season on October 5, 2021.

In May 2021, the lesbian offshoot Princess Charming launched on RTL+ and in October 2021 premiered on VOX.

Production
RTL announced a gay dating show for the first time in late June 2019 and called for application as a candidate. On October 2, 2019, it was announced that Prince Charming will be on display from October 30, 2019, to RTL+. Nicolas Puschmann was also named as the first Prince. Janine Jannes, communications manager at RTL+, said that Prince Charming was planned as a RTL+ original from the start. As of October 21 launched a RTL+ designed by BDA Creative marketing campaign with teaser videos in which terms such as dating, love, romance were called gay (Example sentence: "Dating is gay"). Thomas Huber, marketing director at Mediengruppe RTL Deutschland explains this use of the word as follows: "Unfortunately, the word 'gay' is still used in a derogatory way by some people - we want to change that and finally give the term back the positive meaning it deserves."

From October 30 to December 18, 2019, the eight regular episodes of the season and, following the finale, a reunion episode, moderated by Angela Finger-Erben, were published in the premium area of RTL+. On Black Friday, November 29, 2019, which RTL+ called "Black FriGay", the first five episodes that had been released by then could be seen free of charge. When the final of the first season was published, RTL Group announced that the show will broadcast on 2020 in the free-TV from VOX. Following the announcement of the Grimmprice-award on March 3, the RTL media group announced the date for the free TV premiere: the first season will begin airing on April 20, 2020, every Mondays at 10:15 p.m.

With the Black FriGay event, the extension for a second season was announced. On January 31, 2020, the production company Seapoint called on to apply as a candidate for the second season. The second season should be rotated for publication on RTL+ in July, as evidenced by the first in late April 2020 COVID-19 pandemic was not possible. Production by Seapoint then took place in August. On August 4, the 29-year-old marketing manager Alexander Schäfer from Frankfurt am Main was announced as the second Prince. He should have only been a candidate in April. On October 1, 2020, was announced, that from October 12, 2020, would publish on RTL+ and from October 26, 2020, would broadcast on VOX. The Black FriGay for the second season took place on November 27, 2020.

On November 23, 2020, the show was extended for a third season, for which the casting began. The 31-year-old automotive salesman Kim Tränka from Bremen was introduced as the third Prince Charming on April 27, 2021. The third season of 10 episodes with 18 candidates was broadcast on RTL+ from August 17 to October 19, 2021. On VOX it was broadcast from February 7 to March 28, 2022.

On October 5, 2021, it was renewed for a fourth season.

Format
Prince Charming is the first international branch of the United States mission Finding Prince Charming from the year 2016. Both are a version of the Bachelor-Formats with a gay man as Prince, the basis of group and individual dates attempts among the candidates love to Find. For the sorting out of candidates there is the Bachelor- "Night of the Roses" a so-called "Gentlemen's Night" with black ties instead of flowers. In the first, the candidates who are allowed to stay receive ties; In the following nights, the leaving candidates must return their ties, while the remaining candidates may keep their ties or be asked if they would like to keep them on.

Seasons

Reception

Critical reception
Prince Charming was received positively in the criticism and compared to Bachelor-formats as better. Thus Prince Nicolas Puschmann referred by Anja Rützel to Spiegel Online as the better bachelor (prince). Janna Specken for T-online.de offers five reasons why Prince Charming is better than the Bachelor; for her, Puschmann is the coolest Bachelor (Prince) and she finds the candidates dazzlingly different and very entertaining. In Neon is judged the show was worth more than the bachelor and is the best dating format of all time. Alexander Krei from DWDL.de thinks that the concept feels familiar and that it is a good thing. The first gay dating show is ultimately nothing more than a dating show. “You can find it all terribly mundane and predictable - or just get involved and have fun with the show. This also arises because the "Bachelor" -experienced makers of "Prince Charming" fortunately refrained from portraying the love between two men as something extraordinary." Focus Online editor Tobias Suchanek writes explicitly as a straight man, for him the show is more than just entertainment, it is almost like a documentary, because he is presented with a social scene with which he otherwise has nothing to do in life, and thus his horizons are broadened. For the gay and lesbian internet magazine queer.de, the show is surprisingly entertaining and perfect for binge watching on cold winter days; The selection of the prince and the candidates in particular receive praise.

In interviews, Puschmann reports positive feedback from viewers about the outing stories of the participants and about the fact that he lives out being gay and shows how people dared to come out in their environment because of the show, or others who rejected them have changed attitudes towards homosexuality.

Audience numbers
The RTL media group did not publish any viewer numbers for the show, but described it as their most successful RTL+ reality original to date. According to a report in September 2021, the third season became the most successful season with a 30% increase in viewers compared to the second season.

Awards and nominations

References

External links 
 Official Website on RTL
 Official Website on TVNOW
 Podcast on AudioNow
 Official Website on VOX

2020 German television series debuts
2020s German television series
2010s LGBT-related reality television series
German-language television shows
German reality television series
German LGBT-related television shows
2020s LGBT-related reality television series
Dating and relationship reality television series